Tapenade is a Provençal name for a spread, condiment and culinary ingredient consisting of puréed or finely chopped olives, capers, and anchovies. Its name comes from the Provençal word for capers, tapenas. It is a popular food in the south of France, where it is generally eaten as an hors d'œuvre spread on bread, with fish, in salads, and sometimes used to stuff poultry for the main course.

History of similar dishes

Olive-based dishes with anchovies or vinegar are ubiquitous in Italian cuisine, documented in ancient Roman cookbooks dating back more than a thousand years before the appearance of the Occitan word tapenade. One of the earliest known of such Italian recipes, Olivarum conditurae, appears in Columella's De re Rustica written in the first century AD. Cato the Elder (234–149 B.C.) also includes a recipe for epityrum, an olive spread very much like a tapenade, in chapter 119 of his On Agriculture. The use of capers is the hallmark of recipes for tapenade.

Sometimes tapenade is confused with New Orleans olive salad, a critical component in the New Orleans sandwich the muffaletta. New Orleans olive salad is more properly called a giardiniera. It also does not contain capers but does contain cauliflower, carrots, and celery.

According to the culinary works of Provençal chefs Jean-Baptiste Reboul and Charles Julliard, the tapenade was created in 1880, by chef Meynier, of the restaurant La Maison Dorée in Marseille. He pounded together an equal amount (200 grams) of capers and black olives to garnish the hard-boiled egg halves, then incorporated anchovy fillets and marinated tuna (100 grams each). This condiment composition was then tied with a whisk after adding spices, pepper, olive oil, and two glasses of cognac.

Preparation
The base ingredients of tapenade are olives and capers. The olives (most commonly black olive) and capers are chopped finely, crushed, or blended. Then olive oil is added gradually until the mixture becomes a paste.

In various regions, tapenade is often flavored differently, with other ingredients such as garlic, herbs, anchovies, lemon juice, or brandy.

Serving
Tapenade may be used as part of an appetizer served as a topping on crusty bread or crudités. 

It can be an ingredient in salad, as shown in the image from a Provence restaurant.

It may also be used as a condiment and in preparing fish dishes.

See also

Relish
 List of spreads
Mediterranean cuisine

References

Cuisine of Provence
Occitan cuisine
Spreads (food)
Anchovy dishes
Olive dishes